The 2022 UMass Dartmouth Corsairs football team represented the University of Massachusetts Dartmouth as a member of the Massachusetts State Collegiate Athletic Conference (MASCAC) during the 2022 NCAA Division III football season. The Corsairs, led by 16th-year head coach Mark Robichaud, played their home games at Cressy Field in Dartmouth, Massachusetts.

Previous season

The Corsairs finished the 2021 season with a record of 9–2 (6–2 in the MASCAC). They finished in a two-way tie for second place. UMass Dartmouth started the season unranked and did not receive any rankings throughout the season. The team won the New England Bowl in a 42–16 win over Alfred State.

The team finished the 2021 season unranked.

Schedule

Game summaries

Husson

at Anna Maria

Framingham State

at Worcester State

Western Connecticut State

at Massachusetts Maritime

Westfield State

at Fitchburg State

Bridgewater State

at Plymouth State

at No. 9 Ithaca

Personnel

Coaching staff

Roster

Statistics

Team

Individual leaders

Offense

Special teams

References

UMass Dartmouth
UMass Dartmouth Corsairs football seasons
UMass Dartmouth Corsairs football